The 2015 William Hill Greyhound Derby took place during May and June with the final being held on 27 June 2015 at Wimbledon Stadium. 273 of Britain's best greyhounds lined up for the record prize of £250,000 that was on offer.

Final result 
At Wimbledon (over 480 metres):

Distances 
1¼, short head, 1, ½, 5¼ (lengths)
The distances between the greyhounds are in finishing order and shown in lengths. One length is equal to 0.08 of one second.

Race Report 
Farloe Blitz lined up as hot favourite from trap two in the final and when he was first out of the traps in his customary fashion but tucked in just one length behind was Rio Quattro and it remained like that until the third bend when Farloe Blitz drifted to a middle course allowing Rio Quattro to come inside. The Danny Riordan trained runner then went on to win with Farloe Blitz fading into fourth place, Eden The Kid ran very well after a horrible start and just failed to take second place from Tynwald Bish who ran a good race. Making Paper lost any chance at the third bend when making ground on the leaders and Millwards Davy never showed. Eden The Kid had set a new track record in the heats of 27.95sec = 61,82 km/h = 38,42 m/h. .

Quarter finals

Semi finals

See also 
2015 UK & Ireland Greyhound Racing Year

References

Greyhound Derby
English Greyhound Derby
Grey
Greyhound Derby
Greyhound Derby